At Daggers Drawn may refer to:

At Daggers Drawn (album), debut album by metalcore band Sea of Treachery
At Daggers Drawn (novel), fifth novel by Russian author Nikolai Leskov